Third Plane is an album by jazz bassist Ron Carter, released on the Milestone label in 1977. It features performances by Carter, Herbie Hancock and Tony Williams.

A second selection of five tracks recorded by the trio during the same day's sessions was released under Herbie Hancock's name as Herbie Hancock Trio.

Music
Jazz writer Thomas Owens highlighted aspects of Carter's playing that are noticeable on the album: "It is a treasure trove of pizzicato techniques: portamento effects, vibrato, double stops (including parallel octaves), harmonics, the most legato pizzicato lines in jazz, and those beautiful long notes on the lowest (E) string – notes whose overtone mix evolves continuously as the notes ring."

Track listing
"Third Plane" (Carter) – 5:53
"Quiet Times" (Carter) – 7:52
"Lawra" (Tony Williams) - 6:08
"Stella by Starlight" (Ned Washington, Victor Young) – 8:26
"United Blues" (Carter) – 3:01
"Dolphin Dance" (Herbie Hancock) – 8:20

Personnel
Ron Carter – bass
Herbie Hancock – piano
Tony Williams – drums

References

1977 albums
Tony Williams (drummer) albums
Milestone Records albums
Ron Carter albums
Herbie Hancock albums